Syed Tariq Mahmood-Ul-Hassan, commonly known as Syed TM Hassan is the Senior Leader of Pakistan Tehreek e Insaf (PTI).

Syed TM Hassan is an author, analyst, sociopreneur, think-tanker, and a celebrated legal expert. Syed TM Hassan holds a Master in Laws along with a Business degree from Northampton University, U.K. With extensive insights on the global state of affairs, his books and articles examine the key developments determining the world’s future. He remained President of the World Congress of Overseas Pakistanis (WCOP) of the United Kingdom, and Vice President of the European Council on Global Relations (ECGR). He is the Senior Vice President of the Women Achievers Congress. He has authored two acclaimed books on global affairs. A World In Chaos was published in New York and ‘Dunya Badal Rahi Hey’ has been published in Urdu. He is the winner of the Brian Tracy Award of Excellence and ‘The Social Entrepreneur of the Year Award’. Since June 2018, after losing his two sons in a road accident in Pakistan, Syed Tariq Mahmood-ul-Hassan has set up Ali Zamam Foundation and dedicated his life to working for the greater good of humanity, education, and wellbeing of the underprivileged and the orphans.

Education
Syed TM Hassan holds a Master in Laws along with a Business degree from Northampton University, U.K.

Career
Syed TM Hassan served as a:

1- Vice Chairperson Overseas Pakistanis Commission, Punjab. 
(September 2021 to February 2022)

2- Special Assistant to Prime Minister Imran Khan for Overseas Pakistanis and Human Resource Development (MOPHRD). 
(January 2022 to April 2022)

3- Vice Chairperson Overseas Pakistanis Commission, Punjab.
(September 2022 to January 2023)

Personal life
On June 18, 2018, Syed TM Hassan his two sons, Syed Zamam Imam, thirteen, and Syed Muhammad Ali Imam, nine, who died in a crash while on a family holiday near Okara, in Punjab Pakistan. He set up Ali Zamam Trust at Kamalia, Pakistan in memory of his deceased children to support young children in need.

Books
Syed TM Hassan authored A World in Chaos: Perspectives into the Post Corona World in 2020 which was published by a New York based publisher Hay House. He also authored Dunya Badal Rahi Hey in 2021, a book in Urdu.

References

Living people
Pakistani writers
Imran Khan administration
Pakistani government officials
Year of birth missing (living people)